Maksim Siarhieyevich Niastsiarenka (born 1 September 1992) is a Belarusian athlete competing primarily in the triple jump. He represented his country at the 2016 Summer Olympics without qualifying for the final.

His personal bests in the event are 16.85 metres outdoors (+1.9 m/s, Grodno 2016) and 16.66 metres indoors (Minsk 2015).

International competitions

References

1992 births
Living people
Belarusian male triple jumpers
Athletes (track and field) at the 2016 Summer Olympics
Olympic athletes of Belarus
Olympic male triple jumpers